Strange Idols is a 1922 American drama film directed by Bernard Durning and written by Jules Furthman. The film stars Dustin Farnum, Doris Pawn, Philo McCullough, and Richard Tucker. The film was released on May 28, 1922, by Fox Film Corporation.

Plot
As described in a film magazine, Canadian lumberman Angus MacDonald (Farnum) falls in love at first sight with New York cabaret dancer Ruth Mayo (Pawn) and marries her. Following his hasty marriage, he takes his bride back to the Canadian woods where his financial interests are centered. Ruth, however, longs for New York City and, to keep the peace, they move back to the City where a child is born to them. A strike at the lumber camp takes Angus back to Canada, and during his absence Doris takes the child for a tour of Europe with her old dance partner Ted Raymond (McCullough). Six years later Angus discovers his daughter is the big attraction in the same Broadway cabaret where he met her mother. He rescues her from the midnight show and they go to a hotel where Doris meets them, and there is a reconciliation.

Cast           
Dustin Farnum as Angus MacDonald
Doris Pawn as Ruth Mayo
Philo McCullough as Ted Raymond
Richard Tucker as Malcolm Sinclair
Vonda Phelps as Daughter at 7 Years Old

Preservation
With no prints of Strange Idols located in any film archives, it is a lost film.

See also
List of lost films
1937 Fox vault fire

References

External links

1922 films
1920s English-language films
Silent American drama films
1922 drama films
Fox Film films
Films directed by Bernard Durning
American silent feature films
American black-and-white films
Lost American films
1922 lost films
Lost drama films
1920s American films